The White Hope is a 1922 British silent sports film directed by Frank Wilson and starring Violet Hopson, Stuart Rome and John MacAndrews. It is a remake of Wilson's own 1915 film of the same name with many of the same cast members.

Cast
 Violet Hopson as Claudia Carisbrooke  
 Stewart Rome as Jack Delane  
 Frank Wilson as Joe Shannon  
 John MacAndrews as Daddy Royce  
 Kid Gordon as Sam Crowfoot

References

Bibliography
 Low, Rachael. History of the British Film, 1918-1929. George Allen & Unwin, 1971.

External links

1922 films
British boxing films
1920s sports films
British silent feature films
Films directed by Frank Wilson
Films based on British novels
British black-and-white films
1920s English-language films
1920s British films
Silent sports films